DCGS may refer to:
 Dr Challoner's Grammar School, established in England in 1624
 Distributed Common Ground System, US military intelligence system
 Distributed Common Ground System-Army
 Deputy Chief of the General Staff (United Kingdom)